Mark Raeside Rowand (born 10 February 1968) is a South African rower. He competed at the 1996 Summer Olympics and the 2000 Summer Olympics.

References

External links
 

1968 births
Living people
South African male rowers
Olympic rowers of South Africa
Rowers at the 1996 Summer Olympics
Rowers at the 2000 Summer Olympics
Rowers from Johannesburg